The 1944 Wayne Tartars football team represented Wayne University (later renamed Wayne State University) as an independent during the 1944 college football season. The team compiled a 1–1 record, defeating the team from Otterbein College and losing to Michigan State.

Joe Gembis was in his 13th year as head coach. John Rice was the team captain. Harold Vogler was selected as the most valuable player.

The team was originally scheduled to play five games, but three of the games were cancelled. Wayne had scheduled a home-and-away series with Michigan State Normal on October 21 and November 11, but Normal's coach cancelled, claiming not to have enough manpower. A third game against Muskingum was also cancelled.

Schedule

References

Wayne
Wayne State Warriors football seasons
Wayne Tartars football